Robbie Young (born 2 March 1995) is an Australian rules footballer who played for the St Kilda Football Club in the Australian Football League (AFL). He was selected at pick #67 in the 2018 national draft.  He made his senior debut against Collingwood in round 9 of the 2019 season, and was delisted at that season's conclusion.

In 2021, he was playing for North Adelaide Football Club in the SANFL. In July that year, Young was the victim of racial abuse from former Adelaide Football Club captain Taylor Walker during a SANFL match. Walker was subsequently suspended from playing AFL for six rounds after he was reported by an Adelaide Football Club official who witnessed the abuse.

References

External links

St Kilda Football Club players
North Adelaide Football Club players
1995 births
Living people
Australian rules footballers from South Australia
Indigenous Australian players of Australian rules football